The 2008–09 Toto Cup Artzit was the 10th time the cup was being contested. This was the last edition of the third division Toto Cup, as Liga Artzit was dissolved at the end of the season.

The final was played at Haberfeld Stadium in Rishon LeZion on 17 November 2008. The winners were Marmorek, who had beaten Hapoel Ashkelon 1–0 in the final.

Format change
For this season, the 12 Liga Artzit clubs were divided into three groups with four clubs in each group. The three group winners, together with the best runner-up advanced to the semi-finals.

Group stage

Group A

Group B

Group C

Semifinals

Final

See also
 Toto Cup
 2008–09 Liga Artzit
 2008–09 in Israeli football

References

External links
 Toto Cup Artzit 2008/2009 IFA 

Toto Cup Artzit
Toto Cup Artzit
Israel Toto Cup Artzit